The following is a list of churches in the district of Norwich. The district does not include several of the outlying suburbs.

The ancient medieval city of Norwich within the walls at one time had 57 parish churches, the largest collection of urban medieval buildings in any one city north of the Alps. Ten are still in use by the Church of England, while many are in use for other purposes.

Active churches 
The district has an estimated 73 active churches for 141,800 inhabitants, a ratio of one church to every 1,942 people.

Redundant churches 
NHCT stands for Norwich Historic Churches Trust, a body that maintains and repurposes redundant church buildings in Norwich. Find out more about the trusts aims and achievements here.

References 

 
Norwich
Churches, Norwich
Norwich